Wilhelm von Opel (15 May 1871 – 2 May 1948), known as Wilhelm Opel before being ennobled in 1917, was one of the founders of the German automobile manufacturer Opel. He introduced the assembly line to the German automobile industry.

His father, Adam Opel, had founded the family firm as a manufacturer of sewing machines, and later diversified into bicycle manufacturing. Wilhelm studied engineering at Technische Hochschule Darmstadt and received his doctorate in 1912 from the university. After Adam's death in 1895, control of the company passed to his wife and five sons. In 1898, Wilhelm and his brother Fritz brought Opel into the automobile industry with the purchase of the small Lutzmann automobile factory at Dessau.

In 1917, Wilhelm and his brother Heinrich Opel were raised to the nobility of the Grand Duchy of Hesse. Their brother Carl was raised to the same rank the following year. Wilhelm had one son and one daughter, Fritz von Opel and Eleonore von Opel.

In 1933, Opel joined the Nazi Party and soon became an active supporter of it, making financial contributions to the SS and being awarded the title of Patron.

In January 1947, he was found guilty by a denazification court and had to pay a large fine. He died the following year.

Opel is the grandfather of Rikky von Opel and Gunter Sachs.

See also

 Adam Opel
 Sophie Opel
 Carl von Opel
 Fritz von Opel
 Rikky von Opel
 Opel

References

Opel from AutoMedia Online
Wilhelm von Opel at die.net

 

Wilhelm
1871 births
1948 deaths
German automotive pioneers
Förderndes Mitglied der SS
Technische Universität Darmstadt alumni
Engineers from Hesse